
Year 354 BC was a year of the pre-Julian Roman calendar. At the time, it was known as the Year of the Consulship of Ambustus and Crispinus (or, less frequently, year 400 Ab urbe condita). The denomination 354 BC for this year has been used since the early medieval period, when the Anno Domini calendar era became the prevalent method in Europe for naming years.

Events 
 By place 
 Greece 
 Reflecting the growing level of discontent with his tyrannical conduct, Dion is assassinated by Callippus, an Athenian who has accompanied him on his expedition to take over as tyrant of Syracuse. Dionysius II remains in exile in Italy.
 Athens recognises the independence of Chios, Kos and Rhodes and makes peace with Mausolus of Caria.
 The Phocians suffer a defeat in the Sacred War against Athens.
 Philip II of Macedon takes and destroys Methone, a town which has belonged to Athens. During the siege of Methone, Philip loses an eye.

 Roman Republic 
 Rome allies itself with the Samnites and they agree on a mutual defence pact against the Gauls. Rome also defeats the Etruscans of the city of Caere.

 China 
 The State of Qi is victorious over the State of Wei in the Battle of Guiling, a conflict which involves the military strategy of Sun Bin.

 By topic 
 Architecture 
 The Mausoleum at Halicarnassus in Caria, the tomb of King Mausolus and one of the Seven Wonders of the World, is built.

Births 
 Hieronymus of Cardia, Greek general and historian (d. 250 BC)

Deaths 
 Dion, Greek [tyrant of Syracuse (assassinated) (b. c. 408 BC)
 Timotheus, Athenian statesman and general
 Xenophon, Greek historian, soldier, mercenary and an admirer of Socrates (b. c. 431 BC)

References